Ultrasound in Medicine and Biology is a monthly peer-reviewed medical journal published by Elsevier on behalf of the World Federation for Ultrasound in Medicine and Biology. It covers ultrasound technology in clinical diagnostic, interventional and therapeutic applications, including the physics, engineering, and technology of ultrasound in medicine and biology. It was established in 1973. The editor-in-chief is  Christy K. Holland (University of Cincinnati) since 2006. The founding editor was Denis N. White, who served from 1973 to 1992 and was succeeded by Peter N. T. Wells.

Abstracting and indexing
The journal is abstracted and indexed in:

According to the Journal Citation Reports, the journal has a 2021 impact factor of 3.694.

References

External links

Radiology and medical imaging journals
Medical physics journals
Biology journals
Publications established in 1973
English-language journals
Monthly journals
Elsevier academic journals